RacCS203 is a bat-derived strain of severe acute respiratory syndrome–related coronavirus collected in acuminate horseshoe bats from sites in Thailand and sequenced by Lin-Fa Wang's team. It has 91.5% sequence similarity to SARS-CoV-2 and is most related to the RmYN02 strain. Its spike protein is closely related to RmYN02's spike, both highly divergent from SARS-CoV-2's spike.

Phylogenetics

Phylogenetic tree

Genome comparison

See also 
 RaTG13, 96.2% similarity to SARS-COV-2
 RmYN02, 93.3% similarity to SARS-COV-2

References 

SARS-CoV-2
Bat virome
Coronaviridae
Animal virology
Sarbecovirus
Zoonoses